A. Alan Hill (February 1, 1938 - October 25, 1996) was a government official in the United States. He was Chair of the Council on Environmental Quality during Ronald Reagan's presidency and was involved in negotiating legislation with Canada to address acid rain. He also served Reagan when he was governor of California as deputy agriculture secretary and deputy director of California's Conservation Department.

Hill was born in Palo Alto. He graduated from the College of the Pacific and was an aide to California State Senator John F. McCarthy. He was involved in Republican Party organizations in California and ran for a seat in the California State Assembly in 1977 but lost.

He married and had three sons.

References

1938 births
1996 deaths
People from Palo Alto, California
University of the Pacific (United States) alumni
California Republicans
Reagan administration personnel
Place of death missing